The 2004 FIA GT Championship season was the 8th season of the FIA GT Championship. It was a series contested by Grand Touring style cars broken into two classes based on power and manufacturer involvement, called GT and N-GT. It began on 28 March 2004 and ended 14 November 2004 after 11 races.

Schedule

Entries

GT

N-GT

Season results
Overall winners in bold.

Drivers Championship

GT standings
The GT Drivers Championship was won jointly by Luca Cappellari and Fabrizio Gollin who shared a Ferrari 550 Maranello entered by BMS Scuderia Italia.

N-GT standings
The N-GT Drivers Championship was won jointly by Sascha Maassen and Lucas Luhr who shared a Porsche 996 GT3 RSR entered by Freisinger Motorsport.

Teams Championship

Points were awarded separately in both GT and N-GT to the top 8 class finishers in the order of 10–8–6–5–4–3–2–1. At the Spa 24 Hours only, half points were also granted to the leading eight cars at the 12-hour mark.  Both cars scored points towards the championship.

GT Standings
Due to the Maserati MC12 not being homologated, AF Corse was not eligible to score points from Round 8 through Round 10.  Championship points were redistributed to other GT competitors, ignoring the placing of the AF Corse cars.  At Round 11 the homologation was approved and AF Corse was then allowed to score points.

N-GT Standings

References

External links

 Official FIA GT homepage
 2004 FIA GT Championship race results
 FIA GT Championship race photos

FIA GT Championship
 
FIA GT Championship seasons